The Intrepid Wind Farm consists of 107 wind turbines, located in Sac and Buena Vista counties in north-west Iowa, has a generating capacity of 160.5 megawatts of electricity.  The wind power project is MidAmerican Energy Company’s first owned and operated wind generation facility and became operational on December 31, 2004.

When MidAmerican Energy first began planning the Intrepid site, the company worked closely alongside several state and national environmental groups with a view towards minimizing the environmental impact. Using input from such diverse groups as the Iowa Department of Natural Resources, the Nature Conservancy, Iowa State University, the U.S. Fish and Wildlife Service, the Iowa Natural Heritage Foundation, and the Iowa Chapter of the Sierra Club, MidAmerican created a statewide map of areas in the proposed region that contained specific bird populations or habitats. Those areas were then avoided when detailed site planning occurred.  MidAmerican also worked in conjunction with the Army Corps of Engineers to secure all necessary permits related to any potential risk to wetlands in the area. Regular inspections are also conducted to make certain that the wind farm is causing no adverse environmental impact to the region.

See also

Wind power in the United States
List of large wind farms

References

Energy infrastructure completed in 2004
Buildings and structures in Buena Vista County, Iowa
Buildings and structures in Sac County, Iowa
Wind farms in Iowa